The American Institute of Steel Construction Student Steel Bridge Competition is a student contest that tests the knowledge and practicality of teams of university students in the field of structural engineering. Ideally, the design and fabrication of the bridge is conceived and completed entirely by the students and the participation of the students in the process is highly encouraged. Some schools may not have the proper facilities and guidance necessary to erect the model bridge and may work with a commercial fabricator. However, the students must be fully responsible for the design and instructions, they must coordinate with the fabricator, and they must monitor the construction process.

The bridges must follow the specifications explained in the rule book. The rules of the competition are changed annually to further enhance the quality of the competition and to prevent the submission of an already existing bridge.

History
The steel bridge competition, in its embryonic form, began as a miniature bridge design competition using balsa wood to see which competitor's bridge is the best. Robert E. Shaw Jr., Associate Director of Education for the American Institute of Steel Construction, initiated the steel bridge competition in the spring of 1987 and was honored by the AISC in 2000 for his achievement. The first teams to compete were Lawrence Technological University(who hosted the competition), Wayne State University, and Michigan Technological University. In 1988, the competition grew to four regional conference competitions: North Central at the University of Detroit, Great Lakes at Rose-Hulman Institute of Technology, Carolinas at the University of North Carolina - Charlotte, and Ohio Valley at the University of Louisville. In 1989, nine conferences held steel bridge-building competitions: Upstate New York, Carolinas, Ohio Valley, North Central, Midwest, Mid-Continent, Rocky Mountain, Southeast, and Texas. Michigan State University dominated their Conference with bridges built quickly with innovative, lightweight designs that set the pattern for future competitions.  In 1992, Fromy Rosenberg, who was the new Director of AISC College Relations, began the first ever National Student Steel Bridge Competition.

Past champions
The following are past champions.

Scoring
For a full description of the 2016 rules and regulations, including the scoring go to: 

The different categories in the competition that will be judged are:

Display - Includes appearance of bridge, identification of the school on the bridge, and the poster that explains the thought process and includes sponsors, advisors, and technicians. (Display is only used as a tie breaker, however, the lack of information either on the poster or on the bridge itself will results in an added weight penalty to the bridge)
Construction Speed - The team that constructs the bridge with the quickest time (including added time penalties) wins this category
Construction economy - A formula is devised to calculate a dollar amount based on the number of builders, the time of the assembly, and the use of temporary piers. The team with the lowest dollar amount wins this category
Lightness - The team with the lightest bridge (including weight penalties) wins this category.
Stiffness - The team with the lowest aggregate deflection wins this category.
Structural efficiency - A formula is devised to calculate a dollar amount based on the weight and deflection of the bridge. The team with the lowest dollar amount wins this category

The overall winner has the lowest sum from the construction economy and structural efficiency categories.

Regional advancement
Getting to the National Competition - Teams compete at regional conferences around the United States. The top teams from each region are invited to compete at the National Competition each year.

In a region of 1-4 teams, the top competitor advances to nationals
In a region of 5-10 teams, the top two competitor advances to nationals
In a region with 11 or more teams, the top three competitors advances to nationals.

See also

 List of engineering awards

References

External links
AISC Student Steel Bridge Competition Information: aisc.org/studentsteelbridgecompetition

Awards established in 1992
Structural engineering awards
Student events
Awards of the American Society of Civil Engineers